Airport West Football Club is an Australian rules football club, located 14 km  north west of Melbourne in the suburb of Airport West. Established in 1961, the club affiliated with the Essendon District Football League in 1962.

History 

The club's first senior premiership was in 1978 in the short-lived  A3 Grade (from 1977 to 1985). The club won its B Grade premiership in 1985 and A Grade premierships in 1992 and 1993 coached by Des English.

Senior Premierships  (7)
A Grade
1992
1993
B Grade
1985
Division 1
2012
2018
2022
A3 Grade
1978

External links
 Official website

Books
History of football in Melbourne's north west - John Stoward -  

Essendon District Football League clubs
1961 establishments in Australia
Australian rules football clubs established in 1961
Sport in the City of Moonee Valley
Australian rules football clubs in Melbourne